is a 2004 vertical bullet hell scrolling shoot 'em up developed by Team Shanghai Alice. It is the eighth game in the Touhou Project series, and the third main Touhou game to be released specifically for the Windows operating system. 

Imperishable Night introduces the 'partner' system, allowing the player a choice between four teams of two characters to switch between, each with their own shot type, in real-time.

The story centers around Gensokyo's moon being replaced by a fake during the Harvest Moon Festival, with the chosen team warping time to try and find the culprit before the end of the night and festival. It was first released at the 66th Comiket on August 15, 2004.

Gameplay 

Imperishable Night is a vertically scrolling danmaku game, in which the player character is always facing towards the top of the screen, attacking enemies, dodging their attacks, and having to face a boss at the end of each stage. 

Unique to Imperishable Night is the Last Spell system. Some of the bosses' last spell cards are called Last Spells, some of which are regular spell cards that require the player to deplete the boss of their life, whereas others simply require the player to survive until the time runs out. When a Last Spell is active, the player cannot activate their own Spell Cards, and will fail if they are hit, regardless of how many lives they have. The player also has access to Spell Cards referred to as Last Spells, which are secondary Spell Cards, which last longer and do more damage, but cost twice as much to use.

Another unique part of Imperishable Night is the bosses. Depending on the player's character, the player will either battle Marisa Kirisame or Reimu Hakurei during the 4th stage of the game. there are also two final bosses, Eirin Yagakoro and Kaguya Houraisan. If the player has not used any continues by stage the end of stage 5, the player will fight Kaguya, and if they have, they will fight Eirin. It is required to fight both, however, before unlocking the extra stage.

Time counter
Imperishable Night utilizes a 'time' counter, which requires the player to collect a certain amount of "time points", which are acquired in the same manner as regular points – collecting point items, grazing enemy bullets, or killing enemies. The game begins at 11:00 PM, and with each stage, thirty minutes passes, or an hour if they fail to gather enough time points. The player will receive a bad ending if the clock reaches 5:00 AM. Time will also advance by half an hour if the player uses a continue, or fails any of the Last Spells of Kaguya Houraisan, the game's final boss, who is also the only character to have multiple Last Spells. Because of this system, Imperishable Night is the only Touhou game in which the player can use a continue, and still get the good ending.

Human-yōkai pairs
Imperishable Night features a total of eight playable characters, in pre-set pairs, and, upon completing the game with all teams, the game allows the player to select these characters individually. Each pair consist of one human, and yōkai, with the human being the player's unfocused shot, and the yokai as the focused shot. 

A gauge on the lower left corner of the screen keeps track of how human or yōkai the player is, and affects the player's score accordingly. The gauge, ranging from -100% (human) to 100% (yōkai), is determined by which mode the player uses more. When the player reaches 80%, they can collect time orbs by hitting enemies (as a human) or by grazing against bosses and killing enemies (as a yōkai). Because Youmu Konpaku of the Netherworld Dwellers team is a half-ghost, their gauges are adjusted accordingly (-50% to 50% solo, -50% to 100% as the team), and the minimum values for time orb collection are reduced.

Some enemies use familiars that change their vulnerabilities depending on whether the player is playing as a human or a yōkai at the moment. These familiars are completely invulnerable when the player switches to a yōkai, but at the same time these familiars cannot collide with the yōkai player and do not shoot bullets when the player is on top of them. The enemies' alternating vulnerabilities in this game have been compared to Ikaruga. Bosses may also change their standard attacks depending on the orientation of the player, usually firing slower bullets and/or homing bullets when the player is a yōkai.

Spell Practice Mode

The Spell Practice Mode is unlocked by beating the game with the normal ending (i.e. before the game time reaches 5:00 am). This feature allows a character/team to practice any of the game's spell cards, so long as they have encountered them. In this mode, players have only one life and cannot use their spell cards. Clearing spell cards here will show the creator's own comments on the spell cards or the characters associated with them. The stage practice, allowing the player to practice an entire stage, provided they have completed it already, is also present in Imperishable Night.

Only available in the Spell Practice Mode are Last Words, which are typically the hardest spell cards in the game. These spells are earned by accomplishing certain feats such as beating the game using certain characters, or capturing a large enough number of spell cards.

Plot 
On the eve of Gensokyo's Harvest Moon Festival, the moon has been replaced by a fake moon that can never become full. In order to find the real moon before sunrise, the protagonists search for the person that stole the moon, so they can return it, and prevent the possibility of an imperishable night.

After multiple battles, including one with Reimu or Marisa (depending on who the player character is), who was also searching for the answer, the protagonists reaches Eientei, the mansion of the perpetrator. Once inside, they find that the mansion is guarded by the moon rabbit Reisen Udongein Inaba. From here, the team may either choose the path that leads to the fake moon conjured by Eirin Yagokoro, or the real moon, where the exiled moon princess Kaguya Houraisan is hiding. People from the moon wanted Kaguya to return Reisen to their home planet, and so, she created the fake moon in order to sever the link between the earth and the moon, meaning they would not be able to find either Kaguya or Reisen. The team then accepts Kaguya's "Five Impossible Requests" and fight until daybreak.

Having completed the Five Impossible Requests, the team is given another challenge by Kaguya in the Extra Mode: defeat her rival, Fujiwara no Mokou. Afterwards, the moon is restored, and Kaguya, Reisen, and Eirin continue to live in Gensokyo peacefully.

Development
Imperishable Night was created by Team Shanghai Alice, which consists of a single member, who goes by the pseudonym of ZUN. ZUN had interest in making a danmaku game in which the player can switch between two characters easily during the game, as he believed there weren't many games that incorporated such a system. The idea for Imperishable Night started with this desire, and the plot was written later to justify this system. ZUN had considered the idea for Embodiment of Scarlet Devil, but he felt that having playable characters that had not previously introduced would be unnatural. Thus he decided to make the system in Team Shanghai Alice's third game, Imperishable Night, so he could introduce new characters in the first and second game.

ZUN found it particularly difficult to find a youkai character to pair Reimu and Marisa with. In the end, ZUN picked Alice from the pre-Windows games to be Marisa's partner since he thought Alice was a "Youkai version of Marisa", and thus reintroduced her in Perfect Cherry Blossom. Yukari was selected to be Reimu's partner because their personalities were similar, making them a natural fit.

Reception
Writing for Gamasutra, Michael Molinari singled out an aspect of Imperishable Night'''s stage design for analysis: the stage two boss had a gimmick that limits the player's field of view and "bring[s] the most tension, excitement, exhilaration, etc., despite it simplifying the game and bringing me to the most primitive of mechanics (the process of movement)". He then goes on to say that the presentation and the mechanics of the bullet patterns not only make it possible for this to happen, but also make the gimmick "worthwhile and memorable". 

Related mediaTouhou Bōgetsushō (東方儚月抄) is an extension of the story in Imperishable Night, split into three parts, each carried by a different Ichijinsha magazine. The main component, Silent Sinner in Blue, is a manga serialized in the monthly Comic Rex; it is through Silent Sinner in Blue that the main plot progresses. Cage in Lunatic Runagate is a novel being serialized in the quarterly Chara Mel; it centers on the viewpoints of the characters around the story. Finally,  is a lighthearted yonkoma focusing on Reisen and Tewi Inaba. The plot of Touhou Bōgetsushō overall revolves around the disturbances on the lunar capital, Yukari's plans to invade the moon, and Remilia's rocket trip to the moon.

Ichijinsha sought ZUN for this venture before he started to work on Mountain of Faith, and ZUN once had thoughts to make the manga about the upcoming game. However, as development of Mountain of Faith progressed, ZUN decided that he should base the story on something that Touhou fans were already familiar with. He turned to Imperishable Night'' because he felt the game did not provide much room for character development despite having such a rich cast. With the three-part media blitz, ZUN hoped to expand on the characters' inner thoughts.

Notes

References

External links 
Official website 
Imperishable Night on Touhou Wiki

2004 video games
Touhou Project games
Bullet hell video games
Shoot 'em ups
Video games developed in Japan
Windows games
Windows-only games